Chang-woo is a Korean male given name.

People with this name include:
Han Chang-u (born 1931), Korean pachinko businessman in Japan
Lee Chang-Woo (born 1983), South Korean handball player
Rim Chang-Woo (born 1992), South Korean footballer

See also
List of Korean given names

Korean masculine given names